Institute of Statistical Research and Training, popularly known as ISRT, was established in 1964 by a statute of the University of Dhaka. The institute offers 4 years Bachelor of Science (BS) (Honors) and 1-year MS degree in applied statistics. ISRT also offers PhD and M Phil degrees. ISRT organizes training programs in applied statistics, SPSS and STATA for students in various disciplines, professionals, and academicians. The institute is the proud publisher of the Journal of Statistical Research (JSR), a bi-annual international journal in statistical sciences, published since 1970. It is an internationally renowned journal in the field of statistics. ISRT maintains a vibrant academic environment encompassing a rich library with over 20,000 collections, and three state-of-the-art computer labs for graduate and undergraduate students. Qazi Motahar Husain was the founding director of ISRT. Dr. Tamanna Howlader is the current director.

Location 
ISRT is located adjacent to Khundker Mokarram Hussain Science Building and Institute of Information Technology.

Facilities
The institute has a rich library with the latest books of statistics in Bangladesh. It preserves about 20,000 copies of books written by world class statisticians, periodicals, journals etc. It is open for all ISRT students and other scholars and researchers who seek information within the scope of our collections.

ISRT has three state-of-the-art computer labs for graduate and undergraduate students. The aim is to provide a learning environment that stimulates intellectual curiosity, critical thinking and independent problem-solving skills.

Academics
ISRT offers 4-year bachelor's degree in Applied Statistics and 1-year Masters in Applied Statistics. Students who are interested can seek admission in bachelor's program after being selected in the admission test under the faculty of science and conducted by the University of Dhaka.

ISRT offers short training modules for the researchers, practitioners, students and professionals who need a statistical background as well as computing knowledge with the computer using statistical packages like SPSS, SAS, STATA and R. The institute offers various training programs routinely with the availability of the faculty members.

Journal
The institute is the publisher of the Journal of Statistical Research (JSR), a bi-annual international journal in statistical sciences, published since 1970. Since its inception it has been a means of transfer and communication of statistical knowledge for the developing nations across the globe. It publishes original research articles both in theoretical and applied statistics areas.

References

External links
Official website of Institute of Statistical Research and Training 
 ISRT Alumni Association 
ISRT on wikimapia

University of Dhaka
Educational institutions established in 1964
1964 establishments in Pakistan
Research institutes in Bangladesh